Ede Dunai, also known as Dunai III (born 14 July 1949) was a Hungarian football player who played for Újpesti Dózsa. Dunai III is most famous for his participation in the silver medal-winning Hungarian team on the 1972 Summer Olympics,. He played 12 games for the Hungarian national team and scored 2 goals.

References

1949 births
Living people
Hungarian footballers
Hungary international footballers
Olympic footballers of Hungary
Olympic silver medalists for Hungary
Footballers at the 1972 Summer Olympics
Association football midfielders
Újpest FC players
Volán FC players
Olympic medalists in football
Medalists at the 1972 Summer Olympics
Footballers from Budapest